The Labor Unit of Nurses and Health Employees (ULEES) is a trade union of nurses and healthcare workers in Puerto Rico.

History
ULEES was founded in 1974. For a long time, the union was led by Radamés Quiñones Aponte.

In 2010, ULEES led a picket line outside a hospital in Ponce, calling for a new collective bargaining agreement.

In 2020, ULEES called on the Puerto Rican government to investigate allegations that healthcare workers were prioritising friends and administration staff for COVID-19 vaccination. In the next year, the union alleged that some hospitals made healthcare workers come in for work even while they were sick with Covid.

References

Healthcare trade unions
Trade unions in Puerto Rico
State wide trade unions in the United States